Helene von Bolváry (born Ilona Fraknói; 1892–1943) was a Hungarian actress. She was the wife of the film director Géza von Bolváry.

Selected filmography
 The Village Rogue (1916)
 White Rose (1919)
 The Way to the Light (1923)
 The Woman in Flames (1924)
 Girls You Don't Marry (1924)
 The Royal Grenadiers (1925)
 Women Who Fall by the Wayside (1925)
 The Heart of a German Mother (1926)
 The Love of the Bajadere (1926)
 I Stand in the Dark Midnight (1927)
 Tragedy at the Royal Circus (1928)
 He Goes Right, She Goes Left! (1928)
 Mädchenschicksale (1928)
 The Sinner (1928)
 The Woman on the Rack (1928)

Bibliography

External links

1892 births
1943 deaths
Hungarian film actresses
Hungarian silent film actresses
20th-century Hungarian actresses
People from Esztergom